Stelios Georgousopoulos (28 July 1965 - 28 April 2009) was a Greek windsurfer. He competed in the 1984 Summer Olympics and the 1988 Summer Olympics.

References

1965 births
2009 deaths
Sailors at the 1984 Summer Olympics – Windglider
Sailors at the 1988 Summer Olympics – Division II
Olympic sailors of Greece
Greek male sailors (sport)
Greek windsurfers